The women's open (shortboard) competition at the 2022 Pan American Surf Games was held at Playa Venao in Pedasí District, Panama from 11 to 13 August 2022.

Competition format
The competition consists of five rounds:

 Round 1: 16 heats, 4 heats of 4 surfers and 12 of 3. The top 2 in each heat (32 total) advanced to round 2.
 Round 2: 8 heats of 4 surfers each; the top 2 in each heat (16 total) advanced to quarter-finals.
 Quarter-finals: 4 heats of 4 surfers each; the top 2 in each heat (8 total) advanced to semi-finals.
 Semi-finals: 2 heats of 4 surfers each; the top 2 in each heat (4 total) advanced to the final.
 Final: 1 heat of 4 surfers.

The length of each heat was 20 minutes. Scoring for each wave taken by the surfers is an average of 5 scores given by 5 judges, ranging from 0 to 10 points. The best two waves for each surfer counting and are added to obtain the total score.

Results

Round 1

Heat 1

Heat 2

Heat 3

Heat 4

Heat 5

Heat 6

Heat 7

Heat 8

Heat 9

Heat 10

Heat 11

Heat 12

Heat 13

Heat 14

Heat 15

Heat 16

Round 2

Heat 17

Heat 18

Heat 19

Heat 20

Heat 21

Heat 22

Heat 23

Heat 24

Quarter-finals

Heat 25

Heat 26

Heat 27

Heat 28

Semi-finals

Heat 29

Heat 30

Final

Heat 31

References

2022 Pan American Surf Games